Sabbah Meftah Saoues (born 15 August 1984) is a former footballer who played as a midfielder. Born in France, she has been a member of the Algeria women's national team.

Club career
Meftah Saoues has played for Blanc Mesnil FFCS, Tours FC, FCF Nord-Allier Yzeure and Rodez AF in France.

International career
Meftah Saoues was capped for Algeria at senior level during the 2010 African Women's Championship.

References

1984 births
Living people
Algerian women's footballers
Women's association football midfielders
Algeria women's international footballers
People from Villepinte, Seine-Saint-Denis
Footballers from Seine-Saint-Denis
French women's footballers
Tours FC players
Rodez AF (women) players
Division 1 Féminine players
French sportspeople of Algerian descent